New Parliament House may refer to:

 New Parliament House, Edinburgh, the proposed site for the Scottish Assembly in the 1970s
 New Parliament House, New Delhi the under-construction site for the Parliament of India
 Parliament House, Canberra, the current site of the Parliament of Australia
 Parliament House, Malta, the current site of the Parliament of Malta